Agniashvili is a Georgian surname; it may refer to:
 Levan Agniashvili (1897–1937), was a Georgian lawyer and Professor of Law, member of revolutionary movement in Georgia and South Caucasus; Rector of Tbilisi State University (Apr. 1933 — July 1935).
 Pyotr Agniashvili (1896–1937), was a Georgian lawyer, member of revolutionary movement in Georgia and South Caucasus; Communist Party member since 1916.
 Vladimir Agniashvili (1860–1904), was a Georgian teacher, public figure, linguistically and lexicographer, ethnographer, folklorist and publicist

Georgian-language surnames